The Japanese destroyer {{nihongo|Hishi|菱|}} was one of 21 s built for the Imperial Japanese Navy (IJN) in the late 1910s. She was converted into a patrol boat (Patrol Boat No. 37) in 1940 and spent the Pacific War on escort duties, mostly in Japanese waters. The ship was sunk off Borneo by USS Pope on 24 January 1942 and was struck from the naval list on 10 April 1942.

Design and description
The Momi class was designed with higher speed and better seakeeping than the preceding  second-class destroyers. Hishi was powered by two Parsons geared steam turbines, each driving one propeller shaft using steam provided by three Kampon water-tube boilers. Their crew consisted of 110 officers and crewmen.

The main armament of the Momi-class ships consisted of three  Type 3 guns in single mounts; one gun forward of the well deck, one between the two funnels, and the last gun atop the aft superstructure. The guns were numbered '1' to '3' from front to rear. The ships carried two above-water twin sets of  torpedo tubes; one mount was in the well deck between the forward superstructure and the bow gun and the other between the aft funnel and aft superstructure.

In 1939–40, Hishi was converted into a patrol boat. Her torpedo tubes, minesweeping gear, and aft 12 cm gun were removed in exchange for two triple mounts for license-built  Type 96 light AA guns and 60 depth charges.

Construction and career
Hishi, built at the Uraga Dock Company in Uraga, was launched on 13 October 1920 and completed on 10 December 1920. From December 1939 to April 1940, she was converted into a patrol boat and was renamed Patrol Boat No. 37 on 1 April 1940. The ship was sunk off Borneo by USS Pope on 24 January 1942. She was officially struck from the IJN's naval list on 10 April 1942.

Notes

References

1921 ships
Ships built by Uraga Dock Company
Momi-class destroyers
Ships sunk by US aircraft
Maritime incidents in March 1944
World War II shipwrecks in the Pacific Ocean